Kingsgate Castle on the cliffs above Kingsgate Bay, Broadstairs, Kent, was built for Lord Holland (Henry Fox, 1st Baron Holland) in the 1760s as the stable block of his nearby country residence Holland House. His main residence was Holland House in Kensington, near London. The name Kingsgate is related to an incidental landing of Charles II on 30 June 1683 (‘gate’ referring to a cliff gap) though other English monarchs have also used this cove, such as George II in 1748. The building was later the residence of John Lubbock, 1st Baron Avebury.

The Castle became a fashionable hotel in the 1920s, and was then converted into 32 private flats in 1954.

References

External links
 
 Letter from (T. Pelham-Holles) 4th Duke of Newcastle-upon-Tyne (later 1st Duke of Newcastle-under-Lyne), Kingsgate, near Margate, Kent, to Henry Pelham, 22 November 1748
  English Heritage photograph of castle
 Postcard of Kingsgate Castle

Castles in Kent
Thanet
Mock castles in England